Clear Brook is a  long tributary to the Nanticoke River in Sussex County, Delaware.  It joins the Nanticoke at "Williams Pond" in the City of Seaford, Delaware.

See also
List of Delaware rivers

References

Rivers of Delaware
Rivers of Sussex County, Delaware
Tributaries of the Nanticoke River